The following is a list of episodes of the anime television series Yume Tsukai, adapted from the Fantasy and Mystery manga series Yume Tsukai by Riichi Ueshiba. The original manga series was serialized in Kodansha monthly Afternoon seinen magazine and the serial chapters collected into 6 tankōbon with the first one released on 22 June 2001 and the sixth on 23 February 2004.

The anime adaptation was produced by Madhouse Studios as a 12-episode television series. The series was directed by Kazuo Yamazaki with character designs by Shuichi Shimamura, series composition by Yasuko Kobayashi and music by Tamiya Terashima. It started airing on TV Yokohama TVK on 8 April 2006, fellowed by TV Asahi, TV Saitama , Chiba TV and Tokyo MX TV , and ran between April 2006 and June 2006. The series was re-run on AT-X in 2008 and 2009.

The opening theme single  is performed by Yoko with lyrics written by Yuriko Mori, composition and arrangements by Tamiya Terashima, and was released on 26 April 2006 with catalog code (KDCM-0064). It peak ranked 108th on Oricon singles charts.

The ending theme single  is performed by Ayako Kawasumi and Kei Shindou singing as their anime counterparts with lyrics and composition by Ichiko, arrangements by Mikio Sakai, and was released on 10 May 2010 with catalog code (KDCM-0065). It peak ranked 145th on Oricon singles charts.

Episodes

References

External links
Official Yume Tsukai anime webpage

Yume Tsukai